Eugeniusz Czepiel (15 August 1929 – 23 December 2021) was a Polish beekeeper and politician. A member of the Polish United Workers' Party, he served in the Sejm from 1981 to 1985. Czepiel died on 23 December 2021, at the age of 92.

References

1929 births
2021 deaths
Polish Workers' Party politicians
Members of the Polish Sejm 1980–1985
People from Przeworsk County